Veterans Memorial Park is one of four parks located along the Mississippi River in downtown Davenport, Iowa, United States.  The other three are Centennial Park, which is immediately to the east of Veterans Park, LeClaire Park and River Heritage Park, which is being developed on the far east side of downtown on land that had been used for industrial purposes.  The Riverfront Parkway passes through the south side of the park.

History
The Davenport City Council narrowly rejected a proposal in October 2010 to name the new park on the east side of downtown as a veterans memorial. Instead they established a task force to find a park location for the memorial. They choose Crescent Park, which was an undeveloped area along the Mississippi River near the Crescent Rail Bridge. The council gave its approval in January 2011. An entrance area to the park with three flagpoles was dedicated on Memorial Day in 2011. The other elements will be phased in over a period of years. Phase Two of the parks' development was begun in May 2022. It will create the berm or overlook along the river.

References

External links
Conceptual plan for the park
Artist's concept for the memorial

Parks in Davenport, Iowa
Protected areas on the Mississippi River
Military monuments and memorials in the United States